Accidentalism may refer to:

 Accidentalism and catastrophism, two differing ideologies in Spain in the inter-war period
 Accidentalism (philosophy), the position that events can succeed one another haphazardly or by chance
 Accidentalism (painting), the effect produced by accidental lights

An archaic use of the term accidentalism was the idea that disease is only an accidental modification of the healthy condition.